Andrew Matheson is a British-Canadian rock singer, most noted as a founding member of the British proto-punk band Hollywood Brats in the early 1970s. He later released two solo albums, and garnered a Juno Award nomination for Best New Solo Artist at the Juno Awards of 1995.

Sources are in conflict about Matheson's childhood. In Canadian media, he was reported as spending his childhood in the Chelmsford neighbourhood of Sudbury, Ontario before moving to London at age 18, while British sources state that he grew up in Gillingham, Kent as the son of a serviceman in the Royal Navy. He formed Hollywood Brats in 1971. Although championed by Keith Moon and later recognized as an important early punk band which had a significant influence on many of the bands who would later have success with the genre, the band had little commercial success while active and released just one album before breaking up in 1975. Matheson was then involved in the short-lived band London SS.

Matheson released the solo album Monterey Shoes in 1979. He later moved to Toronto, where he released the album Night of the Bastard Moon in 1994 and was nominated for Best New Solo Artist at the Junos in 1995. He did not release another album in Canada, and moved back to England sometime after 1995.

In 2015, he published a memoir of the band, Sick On You: The Disastrous Story of Britain's Great Lost Punk Band, named after one of the Hollywood Brats' songs.

References

British punk rock singers
Canadian punk rock singers
British memoirists
Canadian memoirists
British male writers
Canadian male non-fiction writers
Living people
Year of birth missing (living people)
20th-century British male singers
20th-century Canadian male singers
21st-century British male singers
21st-century Canadian male singers